Frances Johnson or Gwísgwashãn (died 1934) was the last fluent speaker of the Takelma language of Oregon, United States. In 1906, she worked with linguist Edward Sapir to document the language while living on the Siletz Reservation.

References

Year of birth missing
19th-century births
1934 deaths
20th-century Native Americans
Indigenous people of the Pacific Northwest
Last known speakers of a Native American language
Takelma